Divine Mercy: No Escape is a 1987 American religious biographical film edited, produced, and directed by Hermann D. Tauchert, written by Tauchert and Fr. Seraphim Michalenko, and starring Melanie Metcalf as Polish nun Maria Faustina Kowalska. It was shot in Vatican City, Poland, and Germany in addition to the United States, and includes a presentation by Pope John Paul II. Distributed by the Congregation of Marians of the Immaculate Conception, the film premiered at Mann's Chinese Theatre in Los Angeles, California in 1987. Later, it premiered in the Philippines at Virra Mall in Quezon City on March 7, 1988, and was later shown at the Coronet Theater in the same city for two days beginning on March 31 for Holy Week.

Cast
Melanie Metcalf as Maria Faustina Kowalska
Fr. John Bertolucci
Rabbi Harold S. Kushner
Dr. Robert H. Schuller
Dr. Ali Abu-Bekr
Fr. Bruce Ritter
Fr. Tom Weston, S.J.
Mother Teresa
Francis Cardinal Macharkski

Helen Hayes serves as the narrator.

Home media
Divine Mercy was released on VHS by the Congregation of Marians of the Immaculate Conception in 1994.

A revised version of Divine Mercy was released on DVD on January 4, 2001; this version shortens the film's running time from 63 minutes to 47 minutes.

References

1987 films
1987 drama films
1980s American films
1980s biographical drama films
1980s English-language films
American biographical drama films
Cultural depictions of Polish women
Divine Mercy
Films about Catholic nuns
Films scored by Louis Febre
Films set in the 1930s
Films shot in Germany
Films shot in Poland
Films shot in the United States